Balfour Gardiner (19 February 1897 – 3 May 1945) was an Australian rules footballer who played with Essendon in the Victorian Football League (VFL).

He died in Sydney Hospital in May 1945 after being knocked over by a motor cyclist when alighting from a tram.

Notes

External links 

1897 births
1945 deaths
Australian rules footballers from Victoria (Australia)
Essendon Football Club players
North Melbourne Football Club (VFA) players
Acton Football Club players
Road incident deaths in New South Wales
Pedestrian road incident deaths